Nannette Hegerty was Chief of the Milwaukee Police Department.

Early career
Hegerty first joined the police department in 1976. She later became the first female lieutenant and the first female captain in the department's history. In 1994, Hegerty was appointed U.S. Marshal for the Eastern District of Wisconsin, again becoming the first woman to hold the position. She returned to the Milwaukee Police Department in 2002.

Chief
Hegerty became the first female Chief of the Milwaukee Police Department in 2003. She remained in the position until 2007.

References

Chiefs of the Milwaukee Police Department
United States Marshals
American women police officers
Living people
Year of birth missing (living people)
21st-century American women